Kim Tae-wan (Hanja: 金泰完; born 1 June 1971) is a retired South Korean footballer and currently manager. He is a manager of Sangju Sangmu in K League 1.

Career
Kim Tae-wan was promoted to the manager of Sangju Sangmu from assistant manager after the former manager Cho Jin-ho left the team.

References

External links 

1971 births
Living people
South Korean footballers
Association football defenders
South Korean football managers
Gimcheon Sangmu FC players
Daejeon Hana Citizen FC players
Gimcheon Sangmu FC managers
K League 1 players
Korea National League players
Sportspeople from Busan